Battle Strikers are magnetically controlled customizable spinning tops by MagNext Toys from Mega Brands.

Gameplay
Two players each use one assembled top. The top is placed in the bottom of the launcher. A button on the grip is pressed to spin the top, while another on top releases it. Each player additionally has a device that fits over two fingers which can be used to manipulate the tops through magnetism. The winner is the last player whose top is left spinning inside the arena. The system was later updated to use a ripcord launcher with the magnet inside an extension, simplifying the game somewhat.

System
Booster: The Booster is used to modify your Striker's behavior. Make it spin longer, or easier to control, or better balance.

Core: The Core of the Striker contains the powerful magnet that is used to control the striker.

Lock: The Lock holds the Striker together.

Other tops
 Beyblade
 Battling Tops

External links
Official website

Tops